Kanjiramkulam is an educational hub in Trivandrum Thiruvananthapuram district of Kerala State, India and is located  on Thiruvananthapuram  – Kanyakumari  NH 66 bypass signal junction  and in between Neyyattinkara, municipality –  Vizhinjam International mother port. It is located 4.5 km from Neyyattinkara town and 22 km from the Kerala State capital Thiruvananthapuram. The Indian Postal PIN Code of this village is 695 524. The nearest railway station is Neyyattinkara Railway Station (6 km) and the nearest airport is Thiruvananthapuram International Airport (27 km).
The people well educated and spread all over the world. Kanjiramkulam residence association is the registered NGO in panchayath. Major water source Kanjiramkulam pond.

List of Colleges

 Kunjukrishnan nadar memorial Government Arts & Science College, Kanjiramkulam
 K N M B.Ed College of Teacher Education, Kanjiramkulam, self finance college
 University institute of technology  
Kerala university, Thiruvananthapuram

List of government office
 Village office 
 police station
 panchayath office
 agriculture office
 sub registrar office
 public works department office

List of Schools
 Government Lower primary school, Kanjiramkulam. 
 Mount Carmel Residential School, Kanjiramkulam
 Jawahar Central School, Kanjiramkulam
 PK Sathyanesan Higher Secondary School, Kanjiramkulam
 Government High School, Kanjiramkulam
 St. Helen's Girls' Higher Secondary School, Lourdupuram
 Panchayath High School kanjiramkulam, kazhivoor
 Government lower primary school, nellikkakuzhi

List of Schools near the City
 Mar Ivanios Public School, Venpakal
 Leo XIII Higher Secondary School, Pulluvilla
 New Higher Secondary School, Nellimoodu
 St.Chrysostom's G.H.S.S Nellimoodu

List of Government hospitals in Kanjiramkulam 
 Government Primary Health Center. 
Government Ayurveda Health Center.
Government Ayurveda Marma hospital, x ray and yoga treatment 
Government homeopathic Dispensary, near government panchayath high school.

List of  Hospitals
 CSI Mission hospital, Kanjiramkulam 
Extension center of Dr. Somervel 
Medical college Karakkonam 
[nellikkakuzhi] radiologist service (Ultrasound scan)
 SR hospital, chani neurology speciality
 Jayanthis Clinic, obstetrics and gynaecology
 Selvaraj Hospital
Anupama hospital

List of Dental hospitals
 Divine Dental clinic
 dr. melvin joseph dentel clinic

List of Banking and Finance
 State bank of India 
 Federal bank of India 
 Kerala state financial enterprises ltd
 kerala bank, kanjiramkulam 
 Kanjiramkulam Service co operate society

List of Catholic Churches in the city
 Nithyasahaya Matha Malankara Catholic pilgrim parish
 St. Francis Assissi Church, kulathinkara.
 Divyakaruniya Deevalayam, Venkulam.
 Our Lady of Lourde church Lourdepuram.
 Holy Family Church, Mulluvila
 Christ The King Church, Christnagar, Chani

Social Services 
 kanjiramkulam residence association
 kanjiramkulam sannadha sena, secretary grama panchayath

Closest cities, towns and villages

Poovar beach is 4 km from the town; Kovalam beach is 8 km from the town. The distance between Kanjiramkulam town and Vizhinjam International Seaport is 7 km. Ponmudi is 39 km from the town. Neyyar Dam (35 km from Kanjiramkulam town), is another popular picnic spot. Kanyakumari is 64 km from Kanjiramkulam town.

Climate

Köppen-Geiger climate classification system classifies it climate as tropical wet and dry (Aw).

Kanjiramkulam (which lies 4.5 km away to the south west of Neyyattinkara town) has heavy rains during June–August due to the southwest monsoon. Winter starts from December and continues till February.

See also 

 Neyyattinkara
 Neyyattinkara Railway Station
 Amaravila
 Parassala
 Neyyattinkara Sree Krishna Swami Temple
 Upper cloth revolt
 Thiruvananthapuram
 Municipalities of Kerala

References

Villages in Thiruvananthapuram district